Events in the year 2022 in Malta.

Incumbents

Year

References 

2022 in Malta
Malta
2020s in Malta
Years of the 21st century in Malta